Allium amphibolum  is a species of onion native to Altai, Tuva, Kazakhstan, Mongolia, and the Province of Xinjiang in western China.

Allium amphibolum produces a clump of narrow bulbs up to 15 mm in diameter. Scapes are up to 30 cm tall. Leaves narrow, up to 15 cm long but rarely more than 5 mm across. Tepals are rose or lilac, with darker red midveins. Ovary is round with a very long style.

References

amphibolum
Onions
Flora of temperate Asia
Plants described in 1830